Francesco D'Ovidio (Campobasso, 5 December 1849 – Naples, 24 November 1925) was an Italian philologist and literary critic. He was nominated for the Nobel Prize in Literature four times.

Biography
He was educated at Pisa and Naples. In 1870 he became professor of Romance philology at the University of Naples.

Works
His thorough scholarship and keen criticism are shown in a large number of works, of which the following are the most noteworthy:
 Dell' origine dell' unica forma flessionale del nome italiano (1872)
 Il vocalismo tonico italiano (1878)
 Storia della letteratura latina (1879)
 Il Tasso e la Lucrezia Bendidio-Machiavelli (1882)

References

Attribution
 

1849 births
1925 deaths
Italian philologists
Italian literary critics
Academic staff of the University of Naples Federico II